Jonathan Antonio Muñoz Martínez (born 10 November 1995) is a Mexican weightlifter. He won the gold medal in the men's 67 kg event at the 2019 Pan American Games held in Lima, Peru. He is also a five-time medalist, including gold, at the Pan American Weightlifting Championships. He also competed at the 2020 Summer Olympics in Tokyo, Japan.

Career 

He finished in 4th place in the men's 69 kg event at the 2015 Pan American Games held in Toronto, Canada. A few months later, he competed in the men's 69 kg event at the 2015 World Weightlifting Championships held in Houston, United States. At the 2017 Summer Universiade in Taipei, Taiwan, he finished in 8th place in the men's 69 kg event.

He won the bronze medal in the men's 69 event at both the 2017 Pan American Weightlifting Championships held in Miami, United States and the 2018 Pan American Weightlifting Championships held in Santo Domingo, Dominican Republic. He won two medals in his events at the 2018 Central American and Caribbean Games held in Barranquilla, Colombia.

At the 2019 Pan American Weightlifting Championships held in Guatemala City, Guatemala, he won the gold medal in the men's 67kg event. In 2021, he won the silver medal in his event at the 2020 Pan American Weightlifting Championships held in Santo Domingo, Dominican Republic.

He also competed in the men's 67 kg event at both the 2018 World Weightlifting Championships in Ashgabat, Turkmenistan and the 2019 World Weightlifting Championships in Pattaya, Thailand.

He competed in the men's 67 kg event at the 2020 Summer Olympics in Tokyo, Japan. He finished in 10th place.

Achievements

References

External links 
 

Living people
1995 births
Mexican male weightlifters
Competitors at the 2017 Summer Universiade
Central American and Caribbean Games medalists in weightlifting
Central American and Caribbean Games silver medalists for Mexico
Central American and Caribbean Games bronze medalists for Mexico
Competitors at the 2018 Central American and Caribbean Games
Pan American Weightlifting Championships medalists
Weightlifters at the 2015 Pan American Games
Weightlifters at the 2019 Pan American Games
Medalists at the 2019 Pan American Games
Pan American Games gold medalists for Mexico
Pan American Games medalists in weightlifting
Sportspeople from Aguascalientes
People from Aguascalientes City
Weightlifters at the 2020 Summer Olympics
Olympic weightlifters of Mexico
21st-century Mexican people